Sogpelcé may refer to: 
Sogpelcé, Poa
Sogpelcé, Thyou